Mohammad Qoli Beyglu, a village in  Germi County, Ardabil Province, Iran
 Mohammad Qoli-ye Sofla, a village in Sirjan County, Kerman Province, Iran
 Darreh-ye Mohammad Qoli, a village in Dowreh County, Lorestan Province, Iran
 Qeshlaq-e Mohammad Qoli, multiple villages in Iran
 Bariki-ye Mohammad Qoli, a village in Dezful County, Khuzestan Province, Iran
 Dehnow-e Mohammad Qoli, a village in Lordegan County, Chaharmahal and Bakhtiari Province, Iran